Sylvia Serfaty (born 1975) is a French mathematician working in the United States.

Early life and education 
Serfaty was born and raised in Paris. She was interested in mathematics since high school.

Serfaty earned her doctorate from Paris-Sud 11 University in 1999, under supervision of Fabrice Bethuel. She then held a teaching position (agrégé préparateur) at the École Normale Supérieure de Cachan. Since 2007 she has held a professorship at the Courant Institute of Mathematical Sciences of NYU.

Research 
Serfaty's research is part of the field of partial differential equations and mathematical physics. Her work particularly focuses on the Ginzburg-Landau model of superconductivity and quantum vortexes in the Ginzburg–Landau theory. She has also worked on the statistical mechanics of Coulomb-type systems.

In 2007 she published a book on the Ginzburg-Landau theory with Étienne Sandier, Vortices in the Magnetic Ginzburg-Landau Model .
She was an invited plenary speaker at the 2018 International Congress of Mathematicians.

She was elected to the American Academy of Arts and Sciences in 2019.

She is one of the editors-in-chief of the scientific journal Probability and Mathematical Physics.

Awards 

 European Mathematical Society Prize in 2004
 Henri Poincaré Prize in 2012

References

External links
Website at NYU
EMS Prize Laudatio
 Author Page on MathSciNet
 

1975 births
Living people
École Normale Supérieure alumni
21st-century French mathematicians
French women mathematicians
Courant Institute of Mathematical Sciences faculty
21st-century women mathematicians
Fellows of the American Academy of Arts and Sciences
21st-century French women